Vilar Dam (also known as Barragem de Vilar-Tabuaço) is an embankment dam on the Távora, a left (southern) tributary of the Douro. It is located in the municipality Tabuaço, in Viseu District, Portugal.

Construction of the dam began in 1958 and was completed in 1965. It is owned by Companhia Portuguesa de Produção de Electricidade (CPPE) and is used for power generation.

Dam
Vilar Dam is a 58 m tall (height above foundation) and 240 m long rockfill embankment dam with a crest altitude of 555 m. The upstream facing of the dam is made of concrete. The volume of the dam is 300,000 m³. The chute spillway with 2 radial gates is located at the right side of the dam. The maximum discharge is 500 m³/s. There is also a bottom outlet.

Reservoir
At full reservoir level of 552 m the reservoir of the dam has a surface area of 6.7km² and a total capacity of 99.75 mio. m³. The active capacity is 95.27 (95.3 or 96) mio. m³. With the 95.3 mio. m³ of water 115.6 GWh can be produced.

Power plant 
The hydroelectric power plant was commissioned in 1965. It is operated by EDP. The plant has a nameplate capacity of 58 (64) MW. Its average annual generation is 137.6 (123 or 148) GWh.

The power station contains 2 Pelton turbine-generators (vertical shaft) with 32.65 MW (40 MVA) in an underground powerhouse 350 m below the surface, located 15.6 km from the dam. The turbine rotation is 500 rpm. The minimum hydraulic head is 432.5 m, and the maximum 461 m. Maximum flow per turbine is 9 m³/s.

See also

 List of power stations in Portugal
 List of dams and reservoirs in Portugal

References

Dams in Portugal
Hydroelectric power stations in Portugal
Embankment dams
Dams completed in 1965
Energy infrastructure completed in 1965
1965 establishments in Portugal
Buildings and structures in Viseu District
Underground power stations